At the 1995 Pacific Ocean Games, the athletics events were held at the Estadio Olímpico Pascual Guerrero in Cali, Colombia from June 24 to July 2. A total of 31 events were contested, of which 14 by male and 17 by female athletes. The athletics competition did not attract many of the highest level athletes from the Pacific Rim countries and the host nation athletes were foremost among in the medallists. Colombia topped the medal table with 14 gold medals and 41 medals overall. The United States won the next highest number of gold medals, with four, while Chile had the next highest medal total, with ten.

American Randall Evans completed a 100 metres/200 metres double in the men's section and surprised the crowd by stripping topless in his victory. Other doubles were achieved by host nation athletes Jacinto Navarrete (men's 1500 metres and 5000 metres) and María Isabel Urrutia (women's shot put and discus throw), and also by Mexico's María del Carmen Díaz (women's 5000 m and 10,000 metres).

Medal summary

Men

 American Antonio Pettigrew was the winner of the 400 m race, but he was not the specified American representative and was competing as a guest athlete.

Women

Medal table

See also
Athletics at the 1995 Pan American Games
1995 Asian Athletics Championships

References

Medalists
Pacific Ocean Games. GBR Athletics. Retrieved on 2015-03-21.
LA LUCHA ES POR EL SEGUNDO LUGAR . El Tiempo (1995-06-28). Retrieved on 2015-03-21.

Pacific Ocean Games
Pacific Ocean Games
Pacific Ocean Games athletics
Pacific Ocean Games
Pacific Ocean Games
Defunct athletics competitions